The Korean Language Society is a society of hangul and Korean language research, founded in 1908 by Ju Sigyeong.

Hangul Day was founded in 1926 during the Japanese occupation of Korea by members of the Korean Language Society, whose goal was to preserve the Korean language during a time of rapid Japanization. The society established a Korean orthography in 1933.

See also
 Korean language
Korean as a foreign language
 South Korean standard language

References

External links 
 Korean Language Society's website (Korean)

Cultural organizations based in South Korea
Hangul
Language advocacy organizations